Parry Sound/St. Waleran Island Water Aerodrome  is an aerodrome located on Georgian Bay  southwest of Parry Sound, Ontario, Canada.

See also
List of airports in the Parry Sound area

References

Registered aerodromes in Parry Sound District
Seaplane bases in Ontario
Georgian Bay